Presidential elections were held in Ghana on 3 November 1992. They were the first contested elections held in the country since 1979, and only the fourth contested elections of any sort since the country gained independence in 1957.

Jerry Rawlings, who had led the country since taking power in a 1981 coup, had grudgingly agreed to hold multiparty elections earlier in the year. Rawlings ran as the candidate of the Progressive Alliance, which included his National Democratic Congress, and won 58.4% of the vote, enough to win without the need for a runoff. Voter turnout was 50.2%.

The opposition accused Rawlings and his supporters of engaging in massive fraud, including ballot-box stuffing and altering results after they were certified. Nonetheless, international observers pronounced the elections free and fair.

Results

References

Presidential elections in Ghana
1992 in Ghana
Ghana
Ghana